Fred David Herbold (September 25, 1875 – May 9, 1914) was an American college football coach at the University of Idaho and Oregon Agricultural College, (now Oregon State University).

From Eugene, Oregon, Herbold graduated with a pharmacy degree from Purdue University in Indiana in 1899. He then worked in Montana at Butte, as a chemist for a mining company, and also coached football at Butte High School that fall.

Collegiate coaching
Herbold's first head collegiate coaching position was at the University of Idaho in Moscow in 1900.  He coached the Vandals for two seasons and compiled a 4–2–1 record.

In 1902, Herbold left UI to become the head coach for the Oregon Agricultural Beavers in Corvallis.  He was the head coach for just one season, with a record of  4–1–1.  Herbold's overall record in his three seasons stands at 8–3–2.

After coaching
After the 1902 season at OAC, Herbold returned to the mining industry in Butte, with plans to return to Corvallis for the 1903 football season.

In 1906, Herbold married Minnie Pope in Hailey, Idaho, on August 31. They relocated to eastern Montana to Sanders, where Herbold had acquired agricultural land near the Yellowstone River.

As of 1911, Herbold was listed in the Purdue alumni register as a rancher in Montana at Forsyth. He died in Montana in 1914 at age 38, and is buried in Oregon at Pioneer Cemetery in Eugene.

Head coaching record

References

External links
 

1875 births
1914 deaths
19th-century players of American football
Idaho Vandals football coaches
Oregon State Beavers football coaches
Oregon Ducks football players
Purdue Boilermakers football players
Sportspeople from Eugene, Oregon